Columbus City is a city in western Louisa County, Iowa, United States. The population was 392 at the 2020 census. It is part of the Muscatine Micropolitan Statistical Area.

History
Columbus City was platted in the 1840s.

Geography
Columbus City is located two miles southwest of Columbus Junction and the Iowa River.

Demographics

2010 census
At the 2010 census there were 391 people in 146 households, including 99 families, in the city. The racial makup of the city was 74.2% White, 3.1% Asian, 22.0% from other races, and 0.8% from two or more races. Hispanic or Latino of any race were 41.9%.

Of the 146 households 34.9% had children under the age of 18 living with them, 53.4% were married couples living together, 9.6% had a female householder with no husband present, 4.8% had a male householder with no wife present, and 32.2% were non-families. 24.7% of households were one person and 14.4% were one person aged 65 or older. The average household size was 2.68 and the average family size was 3.15.

The median age was 38.1 years. 27.6% of residents were under the age of 18; 9.3% were between the ages of 18 and 24; 24.4% were from 25 to 44; 23.3% were from 45 to 64; and 15.6% were 65 or older. The gender makeup of the city was 49.9% male and 50.1% female.

2000 census
At the 2000 census there were 376 people in 135 households, including 91 families, in the city. The racial makup of the city was 74.47% White, 0.27% Asian, 22.87% from other races, and 2.39% from two or more races. Hispanic or Latino of any race were 33.24%.

Of the 135 households 35.6% had children under the age of 18 living with them, 53.3% were married couples living together, 10.4% had a female householder with no husband present, and 31.9% were non-families. 28.9% of households were one person and 17.8% were one person aged 65 or older. The average household size was 2.79 and the average family size was 3.49.

Age spread:  31.6% under the age of 18, 5.9% from 18 to 24, 30.6% from 25 to 44, 18.6% from 45 to 64, and 13.3% 65 or older. The median age was 35 years. For every 100 females, there were 103.2 males. For every 100 females age 18 and over, there were 96.2 males.

The median household income was $32,188 and the median family income  was $39,167. Males had a median income of $25,000 versus $22,232 for females. The per capita income for the city was $12,468. About 7.3% of families and 5.2% of the population were below the poverty line, including 5.2% of those under age 18 and 6.7% of those age 65 or over.

Notable person
 Margaret Cleaves (1848–1917), physician

References

Cities in Iowa
Cities in Louisa County, Iowa
Muscatine, Iowa micropolitan area